Peperomia japonica is a species of plant in the genus Peperomia of the family Piperaceae. Its native range is from southern China to Japan and Taiwan.

References

japonica